Shorea carapae is a species of tree in the family Dipterocarpaceae. It is endemic to Borneo.

References

See also
List of Shorea species

carapae
Endemic flora of Borneo
Trees of Borneo
Taxonomy articles created by Polbot